The Silver Lake Reservoir Complex comprises two concrete-lined basins, Ivanhoe Reservoir and Silver Lake, divided by a spillway, in the Silver Lake community of Los Angeles, California.

History

The lower body of water was named in 1906 for Water Board Commissioner Herman Silver, and in turn lends its name to the neighborhood. The upper body received its name after the 1819 Sir Walter Scott novel Ivanhoe.

The reservoirs are owned and maintained by the Los Angeles Department of Water and Power (DWP), and could provide water to 600,000 homes in downtown and South Los Angeles;. Only the smaller of the two, Ivanhoe, remains online. At capacity, it holds  of water. The Silver Lake Reservoir's water resources will be replaced by the Headworks Reservoir, an underground reservoir north of Griffith Park, slated for completion by December 2017.

The reservoir is the focal point of the community and has evolved as a regional recreational resource. It is surrounded by several recreational areas, including a dog park on the south, a nursery school on the north, and the Silver Lake Recreation Center, which includes a basketball court on the south side of the lake. There is also a walking and jogging path, which stretches  around the reservoir.  In April 2011, the City of Los Angeles opened up for public use a three-acre passive park on the east side of the lake dubbed the "Silver Lake Meadow," modeled after the Sheep Meadow in New York's Central Park.

The reservoir was featured in Visiting... with Huell Howser Episode 1610.

Environmental issues

In December 2007, the DWP announced that the Silver Lake and Ivanhoe reservoirs had both become contaminated with unusually high levels of the cancer-causing chemical bromate, and were immediately isolated. The reservoirs were both drained over several weeks in March 2008, and refilled in May 2008.

Two months later, 400,000 black hollow plastic shade balls were placed in Ivanhoe, which remain in use, to reduce the likelihood of the sunlight-fueled bromate. Silver Lake Reservoir was taken offline permanently. This incident pointed out the necessity of protecting the water supply by using underground tanks. The black plastic balls were created in Allentown, Pennsylvania by Orange Products Inc. The balls are also used at airports to prevent birds from landing in water runoff, thus preventing birds from being drawn into aircraft engines.  The balls were certified by NSF International which certifies the safety of food, water, and consumer goods. In February 2013 LADWP contracted with Glendora, California-based manufacturer XavierC LLC to supply an additional 6.4 million hollow plastic shade balls for reservoirs.

Future of The Silver Lake Reservoir Complex
On March 27, 2018, a community-led initiative began to help guide the repurposing of the reservoir complex and surrounding site. The current status of this initiative is the development of a Master Plan that will guide improvements and protection of the reservoirs, and seek to balance its historic character, its use as a community gathering place, its strategic location within the Silver Lake community, and its unique blend of both functional and recreational spaces. The plan was finalized in August 2020 with input from the community and several local stakeholder groups including the Silver Lake Neighborhood Council, Silver Lake Reservoirs Conservancy, Silver Lake Forward, Silver Lake Now and Silver Lake Wildlife Sanctuary.

In popular culture 
The reservoir appeared in the 2018 movie Under the Silver Lake, directed by David Robert Mitchell.

See also
List of dams and reservoirs in California
List of lakes in California

References 

 
 8. http://info.nsf.org/Certified/PwsComponents/Listings.asp?Company=4G760&Standard=061

External links

 Los Angeles Department of Water and Power official website
 Historic image gallery at Silver Lake.org
 Silver Lake Reservoirs Conservancy
 Silver Lake Reservoir at Yelp

Reservoirs in Los Angeles County, California
Geography of Los Angeles
Silver Lake, Los Angeles
Reservoirs in California
Reservoirs in Southern California